Jack Turner (born 26 March 1997) is an English international field hockey player who plays as a forward for England. He made his debut in March 2017 against South Africa.

Turner plays club hockey in the Men's England Hockey League Conference North for University of Durham.

He was educated at Sir William Borlase's Grammar School, Marlow, Buckinghamshire, England.
  
He has also played for Maidenhead Hockey Club and Marlow Hockey Club.

References

External links

1997 births
Living people
English male field hockey players
Men's England Hockey League players
People educated at Sir William Borlase's Grammar School